Blast Radio (formerly known as Tube Radio) is the student radio station and Students' Union Club for University of West London. They broadcast online from studios based on campus. And on an RSL across the local area for four weeks in May. The station is a member of UK Student Radio Association.

History

Originally launched in 1994 as Tube Radio it was later rebranded to its current name in 2007, bringing it in line with sister station Blast 1386AM based at the Reading campus, which was then part of Thames Valley University.

At the time it was the first University in the United Kingdom to feature two student radio stations within the same institution.

The original studios were based at Ealing Studios from launch 1994 up until February 2015 when they moved to new purpose built studios on campus within 'The Heartspace'.

Achievements

The station was nominated for a "Best Station" award in 2007 and a "Best Marketing and Promotion" award in 2009, at the annual Student Radio Awards.

References

External links
Blast Radio

Student radio in the United Kingdom
University of West London
Radio stations established in 1994
Radio stations in London
1994 establishments in England